Yelena Anatolyevna Krivoshey (born 1 February 1977 in Volgograd, Soviet Union) is a Russian former rhythmic gymnast. She won bronze in the group competition at the 1996 Summer Olympics in Atlanta.

References
 

1977 births
Living people
Russian rhythmic gymnasts
Gymnasts at the 1996 Summer Olympics
Olympic gymnasts of Russia
Olympic bronze medalists for Russia
Olympic medalists in gymnastics
Sportspeople from Volgograd
Medalists at the 1996 Summer Olympics
20th-century Russian women
21st-century Russian women